Claude Gruffat (born 13 September 1957) is a French politician and entrepreneur who was elected as a Member of the European Parliament in 2019, as an independent candidate on the list of Europe Ecologie Les Verts. He took his seat on 1 February 2020, following Brexit.

References

Living people
MEPs for France 2019–2024
1957 births